Fang Xianjue was a Republic of China general who fought in the Second Sino-Japanese War. Under his command, the Chinese 10th Army defended Hengyang for 48 days in 1944.

Early life
 
Fang was born in a small Jiangsu (now in Suzhou, Anhui) village in 1903. After studying in his village, he went to Xuzhou Provincial High School, and later studied at the Nanjing 1st Industrial School, then later went to National Central University  (later renamed Nanjing University in mainland China and reinstated in Taiwan after 1949.) After completing his formal education, he decided to attend the Whampoa Military Academy and graduated in the class of 1926.

Career

He started as a platoon leader in the National Revolutionary Army (NRA), and was eventually promoted to the rank of army general during the Second Sino-Japanese War.  General Fang fought in the Battle of Taierzhuang, the Battle of Changde, and the Battle of Changsha. After the Kuomintang was defeated in the Chinese Civil War, he relocated to Taiwan and later became the deputy commander of the NRA army group in charge of defending the Pescadores Islands. Fang retired from the military in 1968 and died in 1983.

Defense of Hengyang

From June 1944, Fang commanded the National Revolutionary 10th Army in the Defense of Hengyang, where he was besieged for 48 days after fighting off numerous assaults by the Imperial Japanese Army.  On the night of August 8, 1944 he telegraphed the Chongqing National Government about the long resistance and his willingness to fight to the death for the sake of the country. After running out of ammunition and supplies, and with no hope of getting reinforcement, he surrendered to the Japanese on the condition that all POWs would not be harmed and all wounded Chinese soldiers would get medical treatment. Initially, he tried to shoot himself, but the gun was wrestled out of his hands by his subordinates. The Japanese commander unconditionally accepted his terms out of respect for his fierce defense of Hengyang, where the IJA suffered almost 30,000 casualties (nearly half of the casualities suffered during the entire Japanese offensive. On the other hand, the Chinese suffered 7,400 casualties.

He later escaped from captivity and received a hero's welcome from Chiang Kai-shek in Chongqing, where he received the Order of Blue Sky and White Sun.  The surviving Japanese veterans of the 11th Army, who personally participated in the battle of Hengyang, organized a group trip to Taipei to pay respect to Fang in after his death in 1983.

External links
人物追析:试析衡阳保卫战中方先觉投降日军事件 

1903 births
1983 deaths
Nanjing University alumni
National Central University alumni
National Revolutionary Army generals from Anhui
People from Suzhou, Anhui
Whampoa Military Academy alumni
Recipients of the Order of Blue Sky and White Sun